Temple Chambers is a set of barristers' chambers based in Admiralty, Hong Kong. It is widely considered to be one of the leading sets of chambers in Hong Kong given its high ratio of senior counsel to juniors, as well as a strong history of appointments to key judicial and government roles.

History 
Temple Chambers was founded in 1977 by Richard Mills-Owens QC, SC.

Notable members

Judiciary 
For the Judiciary, former Senior Counsel's are indicated by an asterisk (*).

Court of Final Appeal 

 *The Honourable Mr Justice Geoffrey Ma Tao-li GBM – 2nd Chief Justice of the Court of Final Appeal (retired)
 *The Honourable Mr Justice Roberto Alexandre Vieira Ribeiro GBM – Permanent Judge of the Court of Final Appeal
 *The Honourable Mr Justice Joseph Paul Fok – Permanent Judge of the Court of Final Appeal

High Court

Court of Appeal 

 The Honourable Madam Justice Maria Candace Yuen Ka-ning – Justice of Appeal of the Court of Appeal
 *The Honourable Mr Justice Aarif Tyebjee Barma – Justice of Appeal of the Court of Appeal
 The Honourable Mr Justice Thomas Au Hing-cheung – Justice of Appeal of the Court of Appeal
 *The Honourable Mr Justice Godfrey Lam Wan-ho – Justice of Appeal of the Court of Appeal
 *The Honourable Mr Justice Anderson Chow Ka-ming – Justice of Appeal of the Court of Appeal

Court of First Instance 
 *The Honourable Mr Justice Anselmo Trinidad Reyes – Judge of the Court of First Instance (retired)
 The Honourable Mr Justice William Waung Sik-ying – Judge of the Court of First Instance (retired)
 *The Honourable Mr Justice Peter Ng Kar-fai – Judge of the Court of First Instance
 *The Honourable Madam Justice Lisa Wong Kwok-ying – Judge of the Court of First Instance
 *The Honourable Mr Justice Russell Adam Coleman – Judge of the Court of First Instance
 *The Honourable Madam Justice Linda Chan Ching-fan – Judge of the Court of First Instance
 *The Honourable Madam Justice Yvonne Cheng Wai-sum – Judge of the Court of First Instance

Judge in charge of the Constitutional and Administrative Law List 
 The Honourable Mr Justice Thomas Au Hing-cheung (2012–2019)
 *The Honourable Mr Justice Anderson Chow Ka-ming (2019–21)
 *The Honourable Mr Justice Russell Adam Coleman (2021– )

Judge in charge of the Companies and Insolvency List 

 The Honourable Madam Justice Maria Candace Yuen Ka-ning (1997-2002)
 *The Honourable Madam Justice Linda Chan Ching-fan (2021–)

District Court or Lower 

 His Honour Chua Fi-lan  – Judge of the District Court (retired)
 Her Honour Winnie Tsui Wan-wah  – Judge of the District Court

Government (Executive) 

 Michael David Thomas CMG, QC, SC – Secretary for Justice (1988–1993)
 Wong Yan-lung GBM, SC – Secretary for Justice (2005–2012)
 Rimsky Yuen Kwok-keung GBM, SC, JP – Secretary for Justice (2012–2018)
 Ronny Tong Ka-wah QC, SC – Member of the Executive Council (2017–)
 Lawrence Li, SC, JP – Chairman of the Financial Services Development Council (2018–)
 Henry Fan SBS, JP – Chairman of the Hospital Authority (2019–)
 Jat Sew-tong SBS, SC, JP – Chairman of the Independent Police Complaints Council (2008-2014)
 Victor Dawes, SC – Non-Executive Director of the Securities and Futures Commission (SFC) (2020–)

Government (Legislative) 

 Ronny Tong Ka-wah QC, SC – Member for New Territories East (2004–2015)

Hong Kong Bar Association Chairmen 

 Ronny Tong Ka-wah QC, SC (1999–2000)
 Rimsky Yuen Kwok-keung GBM, SC, JP (2007–2008)
 Russell Adam Coleman, SC (2009–2010)
 Paul Shieh Wing-tai, SC (2013–2014)
 Victor Dawes, SC (2022–)

Hong Kong International Arbitration Centre 

 Rimsky Yuen Kwok-keung GBM, SC, JP – Chairperson (2020– )

Head of chambers 

 Richard Mills-Owens QC, SC
Roberto Ribeiro QC, SC
 Geoffrey Ma QC, SC
 Ronny Tong QC, SC
 John Bleach QC, SC 
 Paul Shieh SC (current)

References 

Barristers' chambers
Companies of Hong Kong